The Don Johnson Memorial Cup, formerly Don Johnson Cup, is the Junior B ice hockey championship for Atlantic Canada, including Nova Scotia, Newfoundland, New Brunswick, and Prince Edward Island as of 2014.

From 1982 until 1990 and 1997 until 2013, the Don Johnson Cup was emblematic of the Junior B championship of the Atlantic Provinces of Canada -- Nova Scotia, Newfoundland, New Brunswick, and Prince Edward Island.

The cup is named in honour of Don Johnson, a sports enthusiast who dedicated his efforts to the growth of hockey in Atlantic Canada. Johnson, who died in 2012, awarded the first ever Don Johnson Cup in 1982 to his own son, a player for the St. John's Jr. Celtics.

There is no National Championship for Junior B hockey in Canada, similar championships are held in Southern Ontario (Sutherland Cup), Eastern Ontario (Barkley Cup), Quebec (Coupe Dodge), and Western Canada (Keystone Cup)—leaving five teams at the end of each year with a shared claim to being the best Junior B team in Canada.

History
In the 1980s, Newfoundland and Labrador teams dominated the early tournaments. NL teams won five of the first seven Don Johnson Cups. In 1990, the tournament was retired, only to be resurrected a few years later.

Since 2002, the Don Johnson Cup has been dominated by teams from Nova Scotia. From 2003 until 2008, the teams of the NSJHL have won six consecutive Atlantic titles. The streak was broken in 2009 as St. John's of Newfoundland and Labrador eliminated all hopes of a seventh straight Nova Scotia crown. Going into the semi-final round of the Don Johnson Cup, the three NL teams present were 0–6 against PEI's Sherwood Falcons and NS's Cumberland County Cool Blues. In the semi-final, the third seeded St. John's Caps of the St. John's Junior Hockey League upset the second seeded Cumberland County 6–5. The Caps advanced to the final to play the Falcons and upset them 3–2 in overtime to win Newfoundland and Labrador's first Atlantic Jr. B championship in 21 years.

With the passing of Don Johnson, starting with the 2013 tournament, the trophy was renamed the Don Johnson Memorial Cup.

On April 22, 2014, the Casselman Vikings of the Eastern Ontario Junior Hockey League played in Port Hawkesbury, Nova Scotia and became the first non-Atlantic Canada team to compete at the event. The Vikings would defeat the Fredericton Jr. Caps 6–1 in their debut. The 2014 tournament would also mark the tournament being rebranded from the Atlantic Junior B Championships to the Eastern Canadian Junior B Championships. The Vikings would sweep the event with six wins and no losses. The rebranding did not last long. The 2015 championship was originally slated to take place in Arnprior, Ontario, the first to take place outside of Atlantic Canada. It was instead moved to Tyne Valley, Prince Edward Island with no Eastern Ontario team taking part.

2022 Roll of Champions 
Regional Champions
Newfoundland - Mount Pearl Junior Blades
Nova Scotia -Antigonish AA Munro Jr B Bulldogs
Prince Edward Island - A&S Scrap Metal Metros
New Brunswick - Kent Koyotes

2022 Round Robin

2019 Roll of Champions 
Regional Champions

Newfoundland - CBR Jr. Renegades
Nova Scotia - Sackville Blazers
Prince Edward Island - Western Red Wings
New Brunswick - Moncton Vito's

2019 Don Johnson Memorial Cup

2019 Round Robin

Championship Round

Champions

External links
Don Johnson Cup website

Ice hockey tournaments in Canada
Canadian ice hockey trophies and awards
Atlantic Canada awards